Rudolf, 9th Prince Kinsky of Wchinitz and Tettau (11 December 185913 March 1930) was the titular pretender Prince Kinsky of Wchinitz and Tettau.

Early life
Rudolf was born at Hermanmiestetz, Kingdom of Bohemia the third child and second son of Ferdinand Bonaventura, 7th Prince Kinsky of Wchinitz and Tettau (1834–1904) and Princess Maria of Liechtenstein (1835–1905).

Marriage and family
Rudolf married on 20 September 1881 in Vienna to Countess Marie of Wilczek (1858–1938), eldest child of Graf Johann Nepomuk of Wilczek and his wife, Countess Emma Maria Helene Emo Capodilista.

They had five daughters:
Countess Marie Gabrielle Josepha Guntram Kinsky of Wchinitz and Tettau (28 March 1883 – 28 October 1970), married in 1903 to Prince Erich of Thurn and Taxis ; had issue.
Countess Maria Antonie Kinsky of Wchinitz and Tettau (21 May 1885 – 3 July 1952), married in 1903 to Count Theobald Czernin of Chudenitz; had issue.
Countess Emma Kinsky of Wchinitz and Tettau (13 March 1888 – 2 December 1957)
Countess Wilhelmine Kinsky of Wchinitz and Tettau (6 July 1891 – 17 June 1971), married in 1912 to Count Carl Maria Joseph Czernin of Chudenitz; had issue.
Countess Theresia Kinsky of Wchinitz and Tettau (13 January 1902 – 11 November 1973)

Prince Kinsky
He became the titular pretender 9th Prince Kinsky of Wchinitz and Tettau at the death of his brother Karl in 1919, his brother died childless. As for him, without a male heir the title was passed to his nephew Ulrich at his death in 1930.

Ancestry

Notes and sources
Genealogisches Handbuch des Adels, Fürstliche Häuser, Reference: 1956

1859 births
1930 deaths
People from Heřmanův Městec
People from the Kingdom of Bohemia
House of Kinsky